This is a list of foreign ministers of Bavaria.

Sources
Rulers.org – Foreign ministers E–K

!
Bavaria
!
Ministers of Foreign Affairs